Thomas Allen Pollock (August 1, 1925 – August 17, 1994) was a Canadian ice hockey player. He was a member of the Edmonton Mercurys that won a gold medal at the 1952 Winter Olympics in Oslo, Norway. Pollock died of a stroke in 1994; he was the first member of the 1952 Olympic team to die.

References

1925 births
1994 deaths
Ice hockey players at the 1952 Winter Olympics
Medalists at the 1952 Winter Olympics
Olympic gold medalists for Canada
Olympic ice hockey players of Canada
Olympic medalists in ice hockey
Ice hockey people from Alberta
Sportspeople from Red Deer, Alberta
Canadian ice hockey defencemen